Nephthytis swainei is a species of flowering plants in the family Araceae, native to tropical West Africa (Ivory Coast, Ghana, Congo-Brazzaville, Gabon, Cameroon).

References

 Aluka entry

Aroideae
Flora of West Tropical Africa
Plants described in 1980